Miss Chinese International Pageant 1988, the 1st Miss Chinese International Pageant was held on October 2, 1988 in Hong Kong. The pageant was organized and broadcast by TVB in Hong Kong. At the end of the pageant, Run Run Shaw crowned Michelle Reis of Hong Kong as the first Miss Chinese International. Hong Kong would not win the pageant, until 12 years later when Sonija Kwok won the crown in 2000.

Pageant information
The theme to this year's pageant is "Chinese Light Shines Throughout the World, TVB Makes New History" 「華裔光采耀全球  無線電視創新猶」.  The Masters of Ceremonies were Lydia Shum and Philip Chan.  Special performing guest was cantopop singer Leslie Cheung.  This is the first year of the pageant, and makes history as the first ever international Chinese pageant.

Results

Special awards
Miss Friendship: Tanya Lim 林綺梅 (Calgary)
Miss Photogenic: Michelle Reis 李嘉欣 (Hong Kong)

Contestant list

Crossovers
Contestants who previously competed or will be competing at other international beauty pageants:

Miss World
 1988: : Michelle Monique REIS
 1988:  Macau  : Helena LO BRANCO
 1992: Manila, : Marina BENIPAYO (''representing )

External links
 Johnny's Pageant Page - Miss Chinese International Pageant 1988

TVB
1988 beauty pageants
1988 in Hong Kong
Beauty pageants in Hong Kong
Miss Chinese International Pageants